Gudamalani  is a town and Tehsil within the Barmer district of Rajasthan state of India. The village is located in the Thar desert. Gudamalani is situated on the highway connecting Jodhpur to Ahmedabad. This area unlike the Thar desert area is somewhat green and the land is fertile . The Luni River of Rajasthan flows through Gudamalani. This town in near several historical temples, such as Aalam ji's temple, Bhuteswar temple, Guru Jambheswer Bhagwan temple with Darmshala, and Bholaghar ji temple.

History 
Before independence, Gudamalani was ruled by Rathore Kings who claimed descent from Jaitmal, son of Rao Salkhaji and brother of Saint Mallinathji Mahecha. The titular head was called Rana and part of this kingdom was in modern-day Pakistan. Until the death of the last Rana ruler of Gudamalani, the heads of all the villages in both India and Pakistan come to pay annual homage to the kings and their ancestors. Rana Bhawani Singh and Rana Kuldeep Singh are present Rana of Guda.

People of this area have special faith in the god aalam ji (aalam is derived from Persian-Mughal languages, aalam ji is believed to be the reincarnation of Saint Ramapeer. During the rule, the total number of revenue villages were 112. The jagir of Gurha was considered to be bigger than that of Sirohi according to the land area.

Demographics
The population of Gudamalani according to the census 2001 is 4,540. The male population is 2,418, while female population is 2,122.

See also
 Gudamalani (Rajasthan Assembly constituency)

References

External links
 Geographical details
 Shree Vishavkarma Mandir

Villages in Barmer district
Tehsils of Barmer  district